Glentham is a village and civil parish in the West Lindsey district of Lincolnshire, England. The village includes the hamlet of Caenby.

Etymology
The Oxford Dictionary of English Place Names gives the derivation of the name Glentham as glente + hām, meaning either 'homestead frequented by birds of prey' or 'homestead at a lookout place'.  Caenby is said to probably mean 'farmstead or village of a man called Cāfna or Kafni'.

Domesday Book
Glentham was mentioned in the Domesday Book, as being in the Aslacoe hundred in the West Riding of Lindsey. It had a total population of 64 households (very large for the time) with tax assessment of 8 geld units (again very large).  Land in Glentham was held by four separate lords before the Norman conquest and three afterwards:

Lord in 1066: Lincoln St Mary, bishop of.
Lord in 1086: Lincoln St Mary, bishop of.
Tenant-in-chief in 1086: Lincoln St Mary, bishop of.

Lord in 1066: Thorgisl.
Lord in 1086: Rainfrid.
Tenant-in-chief in 1086: Ivo Tallboys.

Lords in 1066: Estan of Farningham; Wulfmer.
Lord in 1086: Wadard of Cogges.
Tenant-in-chief in 1086: Bishop Odo of Bayeux.

Religious Buildings
Glentham Grade I listed Anglican church is dedicated to St Peter and St Paul. Originating in the 13th century, it has had additions and changes up to the 20th. It is mainly Perpendicular in style. Pevsner dates the tower from 1756, and a stained glass window by Christopher Whall from 1915. In the chancel and the north aisle are monuments and brasses to the Tourney family of Cavenby. Set within a niche over the south porch is an image of Pieta holding the dead Christ. At the west of the church is a mutilated 14th-century brass effigy of a female; previously known as "Molly Grime", it was, up to 1832, washed every Good Friday by seven old maids.

In 1885 Kelly's Directory recorded both a Wesleyan and Primitive Methodist chapel, and a nearby barrow. At that time much land in the area was given over to pasture, while main crops grown were wheat, barley and beans.

The ecclesiastical parish is part of the Owmby Group of parishes.

Amenities 
Glentham has a public house, The Crown Inn, a shop, a garden centre (with associated business units) and a village hall.

Other
The village gave its name to a Ham class minesweeper, HMS Glentham.

References

External links

 "Glentham", genuki.org.uk. Retrieved 7 August 2011

Villages in Lincolnshire
Civil parishes in Lincolnshire
West Lindsey District